The Harvard-Radcliffe Program in Business Administration was a joint program of Radcliffe College and Harvard Business School intended to provide women with post-graduate education in business administration.

History
The Harvard-Radcliffe Program in Business Administration began in March 1937, as an eleven-month course Training Course in Personnel Administration, intended to prepare Radcliffe College alums for careers after graduation.  From its earliest days, the program included two periods of field work, in which students worked in factories or in stores or business offices.   The first class consisted of only five students and the original focus was on  work in the field of education. The program was founded by Edith Stedman, director of  Radcliffe College's Appointment Bureau; Stedman also served as the program's first director.    In 1941, Anne Hood Harken took over as director; during her tenure, the program underwent significant changes, partly prompted by the exigencies of World War II and the increased opportunities  for women to hold personnel jobs in industry and government.  The program expanded to offer courses on administrative problems in industry; these classes, taught by the faculty of the Harvard Business School, had earlier only been given to men.   Enrollment increased significantly with this new approach, with the class size growing to 30 students.

In 1944, T. North Whitehead became director.  After World War II, to reflect the program's broader scope, its  name was changed to the Management Training Program. Enrollment spiked briefly after World War II but began declining in the early 1950s.  At this point the program was also running a deficit, and in 1951 the president and council of Harvard voted to discontinue the program in 1953.    Harvard Business School agreed to take over the educational portion of the program as well as the financial responsibilities, with Radcliffe providing housing and classrooms and handling administrative functions.  To cement this agreement, the program's name was changed to the Harvard-Radcliffe Program in Business Administration in 1956.  However, the program offered by the Management Training Program differed significantly from the two-year program offered to men in the Business School; the Radcliffe Program lasted only one year and did not award degrees.   Dudley Meek served as director from 1955 to 1958 and oversaw a revision of the curriculum, which was redesigned to be broader in scope.

In 1959, with enrollment in the program dropping and with increasing pressure to enroll women in the Business School, the faculty voted to admit graduates of the Harvard-Radcliffe Program to the second year of the MBA program.  In 1962, a committee appointed by the Dean of the Business School recommended that the Harvard-Radcliffe program be discontinued.  In December of that year, the faculty accepted the committee's recommendation and also voted to accept women into the full MBA program.

Alumnae
 Betty Jane Diener, academic administrator and politician
 Barbara Franklin, former U.S. Secretary of Commerce
 Barbara B. Kennelly, former congresswoman
 Patricia Ostrander
 Leslie Crocker Snyder, lawyer and former judge

References

 HBS Library Exhibit
 Records of the Harvard-Radcliffe Program in Business Administration, 1936-1977 (inclusive), 1936-1963 (bulk): A Finding Aid. Schlesinger Library, Radcliffe Institute, Harvard University.

Radcliffe College and Institute
Harvard Business School
1937 establishments in Massachusetts